"Ray" is a song by the Swedish punk rock band Millencolin from the album Kingwood. It was released as a single on 14 March 2005 by Burning Heart Records, including the B-side song "Phony Tony" from the album's recording sessions and a live recording of "Bullion". An accompanying music video for "Ray" was also filmed and released.

Track listing
"Ray"
"Phony Tony"
"Bullion" (live)

Personnel

Millencolin
Nikola Sarcevic - lead vocals, bass
Erik Ohlsson - guitar
Mathias Färm - guitar
Fredrik Larzon - drums

2005 singles
Millencolin songs
2005 songs
Burning Heart Records singles
Songs written by Nikola Šarčević
Songs written by Mathias Färm
Songs written by Fredrik Larzon
Songs written by Erik Ohlsson (musician)